Stade Municipal de Bangangté is a multi-use stadium in Bangangté, Cameroon.  It is currently used mostly for football matches, on club level by Panthère du Ndé of the Elite One (season 2013). The stadium has a capacity of 2,000 expandable to 10,000 spectators.

References

Football venues in Cameroon